Joel McFee Pritchard (May 5, 1925 – October 9, 1997) was an American businessman and politician who served in the U.S. House of Representatives and as the 14th Lieutenant Governor of Washington as a member of the Republican party. Pritchard also invented the game of pickleball, along with two friends, in 1965.

Political career
Pritchard was a delegate to the Republican National Convention in 1956 that renominated Dwight D. Eisenhower for the presidency.

He was elected to the Washington House of Representatives representing Washington's thirty-sixth district in 1958, where he served from 1959 to 1967, being reelected in 1960, 1962 and 1964. In the state house, he worked closely with future U.S. Senators Daniel J. Evans and Slade Gorton.

In 1966, he was elected to the Washington State Senate, where he served a single term from 1967 to 1971. In 1970 Pritchard, a member of Washington Citizens for Abortion Reform (WCAR), introduced a bill allowing abortions in the first four months of pregnancy; it was approved and went to the voters as Referendum 20. The measure was approved statewide by voters in November 1970, making Washington the first state to in which abortion was legalized by a popular vote.

In 1970, Pritchard ran for the U.S. House of Representatives to represent Washington's first district, challenging nine-term incumbent Thomas Pelly in the Republican primary. Pelly was renominated, but by a smaller margin than anyone expected.

In 1972, Pelly retired and Pritchard ran for the U.S. House of Representatives again, this time successfully, defeating opponents John Hempleman and Craig Honts in a closely contested election. He was easily reelected in 1974, 1976, 1978, 1980 and 1982, serving from 1973 to 1985. He chose not to run for reelection in 1984.

In 1988, he made a successful run for Lieutenant Governor of Washington, becoming president of the Washington Senate. He was reelected in 1992, serving from 1989 to 1997.

Personal life
Pritchard was the second son of Frank and Jean (McFee) Pritchard. He was born on May 5, 1925 in Seattle, Washington where he attend public schools, and graduated from Queen Anne High School in June 1944.

At the rank of Sergeant, he served in the United States Army from 1944 to 1946. After leaving the service, he attended Marietta College in Ohio from 1946 to 1947. He worked for the Griffin Envelope Company in Seattle from 1948 to 1971 where he became president of the company.

In 1965, while serving in the Washington State Senate, Pritchard, along with friends Bill Bell and Barney McCallum, invented the game of pickleball at his summer home on Bainbridge Island, Washington.

After the end of his second term as Lieutenant Governor, Pritchard went into retirement and became a board member of TVW, the state of Washington's public affairs network. He died on October 9, 1997, in Olympia, Washington, of lymphoma.

Electoral history
1992 General Election for Lieutenant Governor of Washington
Joel Pritchard (R) (inc.), 1,072,968
Richard Kelley (D), 862,063
Absolutely Nobody (IC), 148,021
Tom Isenberg (L), 75,933   
1988 General Election for Lieutenant Governor of Washington
Joel Pritchard (R), 960,655
George Fleming (D), 839,593
1982 General Election for U.S. House of Representatives
Joel Pritchard (R) (inc.), 123,956
Brian Long (D), 59,444
1980 General Election for U.S. House of Representatives
Joel Pritchard (R) (inc.), 180,475
Robin Drake (D), 41,830
1978 General Election for U.S. House of Representatives
Joel Pritchard (R) (inc.), 99,942
Janice Niemi (D), 52,706
1976 General Election for U.S. House of Representatives
Joel Pritchard (R) (inc.), 161,354
Dave Wood (D), 58,006
1974 General Election for U.S. House of Representatives
Joel Pritchard (R) (inc.), 108,391
Will Knedlik (D), 44,655
1972 General Election for U.S. House of Representatives
Joel Pritchard (R), 107,581
John Hempleman (D), 104,959
Craig Honts (SW), 1,401

References

External links

Joel M. Pritchard: An Oral History
 

|-

1925 births
1997 deaths
20th-century American businesspeople
20th-century American politicians
American people of Welsh descent
Creators of sports
Lieutenant Governors of Washington (state)
Marietta College alumni
Republican Party members of the Washington House of Representatives
Military personnel from Seattle
Politicians from Seattle
Republican Party members of the United States House of Representatives from Washington (state)
United States Army soldiers
Republican Party Washington (state) state senators
Pickleball
Sports inventors and innovators